The Plastics may refer to

Plastics, a Japanese technopop band
The Plastics, a South African indie rock band
The Plastics, name of a clique of schoolgirls in the film Mean Girls